The Coptic Apocalypse of Paul is a Gnostic apocalyptic writing. It is the second tractate in Codex V of the Nag Hammadi library. The depiction of Paul the Apostle in the text is consistent with second-century AD Valentinianism. The content of the text can be divided into three parts: an epiphany scene, a scene of judgment and punishment, and a heavenly journey. The basis of the ascent narrative is Paul's own writing in 2 Corinthians 12, and Paul ultimately ascends to the tenth level of heaven.

Summary
The opening lines are lost because of damage to the codex. Paul meets a little child and asks which road to take to Jerusalem. The child replies by asking for Paul's name so that he could guide him, but the child admits that he knew who Paul was and that Paul was meant to go to Jerusalem. The child then claims to be the Spirit who accompanies Paul, encouraging him to awaken his mind to the spiritual realm and overcome the challenges posed by various authorities.

The child, called the Holy Spirit, tells Paul to awaken his mind and recognize that he is standing on the mountain of Jericho, revealing hidden things in the visible world. This epiphany scene alludes to Paul's writings in Galatians 1 and 2.

The Holy Spirit instructs Paul to go to the twelve apostles, who are elect spirits, and he sees them greeting him. The Holy Spirit then raises Paul to the third and fourth heavens (alluding to 2 Corinthians 12), where Paul sees his likeness on Earth and the twelve apostles at his side in creation.

In the fourth heaven, Paul sees angels resembling gods bringing a soul out of the land of the dead and whipping it. The toll-collector in the fourth heaven tells the soul that it committed lawless deeds and brings three witnesses to testify against it. The soul listens to the testimony of the witnesses and is cast down before being sent to a prepared body, with its witnesses finished.

The Holy Spirit tells Paul to proceed toward him, and Paul goes up to the fifth heaven, where he sees his fellow apostles and a great angel with three others holding whips, goading souls towards judgment. This scene alludes to the Erinyes of Greek mythology. Paul continues with the Holy Spirit to the sixth heaven, where he sees a great light shining down and speaks to the toll-collector who opens the gate for them.

In the seventh heaven, Paul sees an old man, representing a demiurgic power, with a bright throne who speaks to him. Paul explains his destination, and the old man questions how Paul will get away from him. The Holy Spirit advises Paul to give a sign, and the old man turns his face down toward his creation. The negative depiction of the old man who attempts to block the soul's ascent makes the work definitively Gnostic and anti-Jewish.

After visiting the seventh heaven, Paul and the Holy Spirit go up to the Ogdoad. Paul sees the twelve apostles who greet him, and the pair go up to the ninth heaven. There Paul greets everyone before they continue to the tenth heaven, where Paul greets his fellow spirits.

References

Christian apocalyptic writings
Coptic literature
Gnostic apocrypha
2nd-century Christian texts